Cigaritis phanes, the silvery bar, is a butterfly of the family Lycaenidae. It is found in south-west Africa, including Botswana, Zimbabwe and South Africa. In South Africa it is found from north-western KwaZulu-Natal to the northern part of the Free State, Gauteng, Mpumalanga, Limpopo, North West and Northern Cape.

The wingspan is 24–27 mm for males and 26–30 mm for females. Adults are on wing year-round with peaks from September to November and from March to June.

The larvae feed on Acacia mellifera and Ximenia caffra. They are associated with the ant species Crematogaster castanea.

References

External links
Die Gross-Schmetterlinge der Erde 13: Die Afrikanischen Tagfalter. Plate XIII 69 d,e

Butterflies described in 1873
Cigaritis
Butterflies of Africa
Taxa named by Roland Trimen